Olearia burgessii is a species of flowering plant in the family Asteraceae and is endemic to south-eastern New South Wales. It is a shrub with scattered elliptic to egg-shaped leaves with the narrower end towards the base, and white and yellow, daisy-like inflorescences.

Description 
The upper surface of the leaves is glabrous and the lower surface is covered with woolly, greyish hairs. Flowering occurs from July to November and the fruit is a silky-hairy achene, the pappus with 26 to 40 long bristles.

Taxonomy 
Olearia burgessii was first formally described in 1991 by Nicholas Sean Lander in the journal Telopea based on plant material collected by the Rev. Colin Ernest Bryce Hawthorn Burgess near Thirlmere in 1959. The specific epithet (burgessii) honours the collector of the type specimens.

Distribution and habitat 
This daisy-bush grows in forest mainly in the Burragorang-Picton area and near Tumbarumba, in south-eastern New South Wales.

References

burgessii
Flora of New South Wales
Taxa named by Neville Grant Walsh
Plants described in 1991